This article refers to crime in the U.S. state of North Dakota.

Statistics
In 2010 there were 13,558 crimes reported in North Dakota, including 10 murders.

In 2011 there were 15,033 crimes reported, including 24 murders.

In 2012 there were 16,020 crimes reported, including 25 murders.

In 2013 there were 17,335 crimes reported, including 16 murders.

In 2014 there were 17,858 crimes reported, including 23 murders.

In 2015 there were 19,665 crimes reported, including 21 murders.

In 2016 there were 19,305 crimes reported, including 15 murders.

In 2017 there were 18,786 crimes reported, including 10 murders.

In 2018 there were 17,775 crimes reported, including 18 murders.

In 2019 there were 17,235 crimes reported, including 24 murders.

In 2020 there were 10,815 crimes reported, including 32 murders.

Capital punishment laws

Capital punishment is not applied in this state.

References